The Deputy Chief Minister is a member of the state government and usually the second highest ranking executive officer of their state's council of ministers. While not a constitutional office, it seldom carries any specific powers. A deputy chief minister usually also holds a cabinet portfolio such as home minister or finance minister. In the parliamentary system of government, the Chief Minister is treated as the "first among equals" in the cabinet; the position of deputy chief minister is used to bring political stability and strength within a coalition government.

Currently, 11 out of the 28 states and none out of the 8 union territories have deputy chief ministers. Out of these 10 states and union territories, Andhra Pradesh has five deputy chief ministers and Uttar Pradesh ,Nagaland,Meghalaya have two deputy chief ministers. No other states and union territories have more than one deputy chief minister in office.

Five incumbents belong to the Bharatiya Janata Party, five incumbents belong to the YSR Congress Party, two incumbents belong to the  National People's Party (India) one to the Indian National Congress,one to Nationalist Democratic Progressive Party one to the Rashtriya Janata Dal . The longest-serving Deputy Chief Minister of India was Sushil Kumar Modi who served as Deputy Chief Minister of Bihar from Bharatiya Janata Party.

Current Indian deputy chief ministers

See also
 List of current Indian chief ministers
 List of longest-serving Indian chief ministers
 List of female chief ministers in India
 List of chief ministers from the Bharatiya Janata Party
 List of chief ministers from the Communist Party of India (Marxist)
 List of chief ministers from the Indian National Congress
 List of deputy prime ministers of India

References

 
Lists of current office-holders in India